Old Milwaukee may refer to:

Old Milwaukee, dry lager

Places
United States
Old Milwaukee East Colonia, Texas
Old Milwaukee West Colonia, Texas